Kenneth Perry Landon (27 March 1903 Meadville, Pennsylvania – 26 August 1993  Arlington, Virginia) was a government and academic specialist on Thailand. He and his wife, Margaret Landon, were Presbyterian missionaries in southern Thailand from 1927 to 1937. At the start of America's participation in World War Two, he was called to Washington to become a State Department specialist on Thailand. After the war, he became an academic promoter of the study of Thailand.

He was the husband of Margaret Landon, who was best known for writing Anna and the King of Siam.

Early life and career 
Landon was born in Meadville, Pennsylvania. He studied at Wheaton College and served as a Presbyterian missionary in Thailand from 1927 to 1937. 

They returned, and he received a master's degree and doctorate in comparative religion from the University of Chicago. He taught philosophy and psychology at Earlham College, a Quaker institution.  While at Earlham, he taught what was probably the first undergraduate course in Chinese philosophy and published several monographs, including  Siam in Transition and The Chinese in Thailand,   before joining a predecessor office of the Office of Strategic Services in Washington on the eve of World War Two, during which he also worked for the Board of Economic Warfare. 

After the war, Landon served as associate dean of the School of Language and Area Studies at the Foreign Service Institute and was on the Operations Coordinating Board of the National Security Council. He then served as director of the Center for South and Southeast Asian Studies at American University until his retirement in 1974. He died of cancer in 1993.

References 
 "Kenneth Perry Landon, Specialist On Asia, Dies," Washington Post 27 August, 1993
 
 Landon Archival Collection Wheaton College.
 * Margaret and Kenneth Landon Papers (SC-38), Wheaton College Special Collections, Wheaton, Illinois

Notes

External links
 Interview with Kenneth P. Landon

1903 births
1993 deaths
American Presbyterian missionaries
Presbyterian missionaries in Thailand
Wheaton College (Illinois) alumni
American foreign policy writers
American male non-fiction writers
Thai studies scholars
University of Chicago alumni
Earlham College faculty
American University faculty and staff
United States National Security Council staffers
People from Meadville, Pennsylvania
Deaths from cancer in Washington, D.C.
American expatriates in Thailand
People of the Office of Strategic Services